Mortrée is a commune in the Orne department in north-western France. On 1 January 2019, the former commune Saint-Hilaire-la-Gérard was merged into Mortrée.

Heraldry

See also
Communes of the Orne department

References

Communes of Orne